Kevin Williams (born August 16, 1980) is an American former football defensive tackle. He was drafted by the Minnesota Vikings ninth overall in the 2003 NFL Draft. He played college football at Oklahoma State.

College career
Williams attended Oklahoma State University, where he was a mainstay on the Oklahoma State Cowboys football team's defensive front, starting 42 games during his career.  He recorded 160 tackles, 38 tackles for loss, and 18.5 sacks during his career and was an integral part of a team that improved from 3-8 with 1 win in the conference in 2000 to an 8-5 overall record with a 5-3 conference mark in 2002. The Cowboys' Houston Bowl appearance in 2002 was only the second time in 14 years that OSU made it to a bowl game.

Professional career

2003 NFL Draft
After an outstanding performance during the Senior Bowl, Williams went from a marginal first round choice to a possible top 12 pick for the 2003 NFL Draft in most scouts' estimation. However, he was considered a “classic one-year wonder” and compared to Gerard Warren by Stewart Mandel of Sports Illustrated. Others considered Williams "a more natural end" and suggested a move to the edge in the NFL. The Vikings were actually slotted as the 7th team for the 1st round of the draft, but when their 15 minutes on the clock expired, two other teams rushed in and made selections (Jacksonville took Byron Leftwich and Carolina selected Jordan Gross) before Minnesota finally got to choose Williams.

Minnesota Vikings
In 2003, Williams was one of the top impact rookie defenders in team history and led the Vikings with 10.5 sacks, the 2nd-most sacks by a Vikings rookie behind Keith Millard's 11.0 in 1985. He was a consensus All-Rookie team honoree having started opening 12 games of the season at left defensive end and moved inside to start at nose tackle for the final 4 games. He set the Vikings rookie record with 3.0 sacks in season finale at Arizona on December 28. Williams was named NFC Defensive Rookie of the Month when he had 18 tackles, 5.0 sacks, a forced fumble and an interception in the 4-game stretch and joined Carl Eller (1964) and Al Noga (1988) as the only rookie defensive ends in team history to start the season opener when he debuted in the lineup at Green Bay September 7 and also joined defensive end Lance Johnstone as players with 10.0+ sacks, the first time in Vikings history since 1993 when Chris Doleman and John Randle accomplished the feat.

Williams compiled 11.5 sacks in 2004, 4 in 2005, and 5 in 2006. Williams played under tackle in the Minnesota Vikings 4-3 defense, with teammate Pat Williams manning the nose tackle position. They were known collectively as the "Williams Wall" as well as the "Williams Wrecking Crew" due to their physical presence at the line of scrimmage, an attribute that helped them lead the Vikings to the best rushing defense in the league for three consecutive seasons (2006–08).

On December 23, 2006, the Minnesota Vikings signed him to a new 7-year contract extension that could reach $50 million with incentives, the contract also included $16 million in guaranteed money.

In 2007, during the NFL Kickoff game, Williams intercepted Atlanta Falcons quarterback Joey Harrington and ran 54 yards for a touchdown in the 1st quarter. This was the Vikings' first TD for the 2007 season. In week 14 of the same season, Williams intercepted San Francisco 49ers quarterback Trent Dilfer and returned the pick for a touchdown in the 1st quarter. It was the first touchdown of the game and William's second interception touchdown of the season.

On December 2, 2008, he received a four-game suspension for use of a diuretic, which can be used a masking agent for steroid use. It is believed that the diuretic was found in a weight-loss supplement that he had been taking. Williams, along with Pat Williams, appealed the suspension to a Minnesota federal court; the judge ruled against the NFL's decision and allowed all suspended players, including Williams, to play until a further review of the case. The case review had been ongoing through the entire 2009 and 2010 NFL seasons, but in 2011, he was suspended for only 2 games under the rules of the new Collective Bargaining Agreement.

Seattle Seahawks
On June 12, 2014, Williams signed a one-year contract with the Seattle Seahawks in excess of $2 million. He would play all 16 games for the Seahawks that season, recording 30 tackles, 3 sacks, 2 pass deflections, and 6 tackles for loss on the #1 defense in points allowed in the league. Williams played in his first career Super Bowl in Super Bowl XLIX. In the Super Bowl, Williams recorded 3 tackles, but the Seahawks lost 28–24 to the New England Patriots.

New Orleans Saints
The New Orleans Saints signed Williams to a one-year contract on June 12, 2015. He blocked an extra point during the Saints Week 12 matchup against the Carolina Panthers. Stephone Anthony picked it up and returned it for two points, becoming the first person to do so.

Retirement
On July 27, 2016, Williams signed a one-day contract with the Minnesota Vikings before announcing his retirement from professional football.

NFL career statistics

Personal life
Williams graduated from Fordyce High School in 1998, where many of his individual football records still stand. Williams married in June 2005 to Tasha, who ended her collegiate basketball career in 2006 as a senior at Louisiana Tech and helped the Lady Techsters to the NCAA Tournament, earning all-conference honors. Kevin majored in general studies and earned his degree in the spring of 2003 from Oklahoma State.

References

External links
Minnesota Vikings Bio
Seattle Seahawks bio

1980 births
African-American players of American football
American football defensive ends
American football defensive tackles
Living people
Minnesota Vikings players
National Conference Pro Bowl players
New Orleans Saints players
Oklahoma State Cowboys football players
People from Arkadelphia, Arkansas
Players of American football from Arkansas
Seattle Seahawks players
21st-century African-American sportspeople
20th-century African-American people
Ed Block Courage Award recipients